This article is a list of diseases of black walnuts (Juglans nigra).

Bacterial diseases

Fungal diseases

Nematodes, parasitic

References 

 Common Names of Diseases, The American Phytopathological Society

Lists of plant diseases
Nut tree diseases
+diseases